Joseph V. Battin (November 11, 1853 – December 10, 1937) was a 19th-century Major League Baseball player. He was born in Philadelphia, Pennsylvania.

Battin played major league baseball from 1871 to 1884 and then returned for one season in 1890, after several years in various minor leagues. Battin primarily played at second base and third base, although he occasionally filled in at other roles as well.

His best year was in 1876 for the St. Louis Brown Stockings, when he batted .300 and scored 34 runs.

Battin briefly served as manager for two different teams; the Pittsburgh Alleghenys of the American Association in 1883 (2–11 record) and 1884 (6–7 record), and the Chicago Browns/Pittsburgh Stogies of the Union Association in 1884 (1–5 record).

In 1936, the National Baseball Hall of Fame and Museum listed Battin on the ballot. He received one vote.

Battin died at the age of 84 in Akron, Ohio, where he was buried at the Glendale Cemetery.

See also
List of Major League Baseball player–managers

References

External links

1853 births
1937 deaths
19th-century baseball players
Baltimore Monumentals players
Baseball players from Philadelphia
Binghamton Bingoes players
Buffalo Bisons (minor league) players
Chicago Browns/Pittsburgh Stogies managers
Chicago Browns/Pittsburgh Stogies players
Cleveland Forest Citys players
Easton Dutchmen players
Hartford (minor league baseball) players
Lynn Live Oaks players
Major League Baseball infielders
Major League Baseball player-managers
New Bedford (minor league baseball) players
New Haven (minor league baseball) players
Philadelphia Athletics (minor league) players
Philadelphia Athletics (NA) players
Philadelphia Phillies (minor league) players
Pittsburgh Alleghenys managers
Pittsburgh Alleghenys players
Reading Actives players
Saginaw-Bay City Hyphens players
St. Louis Brown Stockings players
St. Louis Brown Stockings (NA) players
Syracuse Stars (AA) players
Syracuse Stars (minor league baseball) players
Waterbury (minor league baseball) players
Waterbury Brass Citys players
Waterbury Brassmen players
Worcester (minor league baseball) players
Burials in Ohio